Şərif is a village and municipality in the Balakan Rayon of Azerbaijan. It has a population of 3,231.

References

Populated places in Balakan District